HMS Stubborn was an S-class submarine of the Royal Navy, and part of the Third Group built of that class.  She was built by Cammell Laird and launched on 11 November 1942. So far she has been the only ship of the Royal Navy to bear the name Stubborn.

Career
Stubborn spent the war in home waters, operating off the Scandinavian coast, and in the Pacific Far East.

Home waters

While on patrol in the Bay of Biscay, she fired torpedoes at a group of three German submarines escorted by two destroyers. The torpedoes however missed their targets and the attack was not observed by the Germans.  The two escorts were identified by Stubborn as s. The German submarines were returning from patrol and were bound for Bordeaux.

Stubborn also made an unsuccessful attack on a German convoy off the Follafjord, west of Namsos, Norway, and on 11 February 1944, she sank the German merchant Makki Faulbaum and torpedoed and damaged the German merchant Felix D. some 25 miles north-west of Namsos, Norway. She later made an unsuccessful attack on a German convoy of five ships off the Folda Fjord, Norway. Stubborn fired six torpedoes but none found their target. Stubborn was heavily damaged by the German escort ships which jammed her aft hydroplanes "hard-adive", flooded an internal tank and damaged one of her propellers. As a result of this, Stubborn fell to 400 feet and her Captain, Lt. A. A. Duff, RN, was forced to blow main ballast to get her to the surface. She broke the surface only to dive hard again to a depth of 500 feet - 200 feet deeper than her designed maximum depth. Eventually the Germans broke off the attack and Duff struck for home, considerably hampered by the damage sustained and further hampered when the rudder disconnected itself. She was then sent to Devonport for major repairs, where Lt. Cdr Alastair Mars saw her and described her thus:

She gave the impression of a skeleton's chest; for her ribs protruded whilst between them, her steel plates had been pressed inwards to form concave curves, this bizarre effect providing unforgettable tribute to the workmanship of the men who built her."

Pacific Far East
Stubborn was transferred, arriving in mid 1945, but had a distinguished career there before the war ended.  She sank the Japanese patrol vessel Patrol Boat No.2 (the former destroyer ) in the Java Sea. The survivors were ordered to be shot in the water due to suspicious behaviour. Before this order was carried out, Stubborn was forced to dive by a circling aircraft and the survivors were left alive.  She went on to sink a Japanese sailing vessel and an unidentified small Japanese vessel.

Post war
Stubborn survived the Second World War and was sunk on 30 April 1946 as an ASDIC target off Malta.

References

 

 

British S-class submarines (1931)
Shipwrecks in the Mediterranean Sea
Ships built on the River Mersey
Ships sunk as targets
1942 ships
World War II submarines of the United Kingdom
Maritime incidents in 1946
Shipwrecks of Malta
Royal Navy ship names